The 1998 Primestar 500 was the fourth stock car race of the 1998 NASCAR Winston Cup Series season and the 39th iteration of the event. The race was originally scheduled to be held on Sunday, March 8, 1998, but was postponed to Monday, March 9 due to rain. The race was held in Hampton, Georgia at Atlanta Motor Speedway, a  permanent asphalt quad-oval intermediate speedway. The race took the scheduled 325 laps to complete. In the late stages of the race, Joe Gibbs Racing driver Bobby Labonte would manage to pass for the lead with 47 to go and take his sixth career NASCAR Winston Cup Series victory and his first victory of the season. To fill out the podium, Robert Yates Racing driver Dale Jarrett and Penske-Kranefuss Racing driver Jeremy Mayfield would finish second and third, respectively.

Background 

Atlanta Motor Speedway (formerly Atlanta International Raceway) is a 1.54-mile race track in Hampton, Georgia, United States, 20 miles (32 km) south of Atlanta. It has annually hosted NASCAR Winston Cup Series stock car races since its inauguration in 1960.

The venue was bought by Speedway Motorsports in 1990. In 1994, 46 condominiums were built over the northeastern side of the track. In 1997, to standardize the track with Speedway Motorsports' other two intermediate ovals, the entire track was almost completely rebuilt. The project made the track one of the fastest on the NASCAR circuit.

Entry list 

 (R) - denotes rookie driver.

*Was replaced by Phil Parsons after injuring himself in first practice.

Practice 
Originally, two practice sessions were scheduled to be held, with one on Friday, March 6, and one on Saturday, March 7, However, due to rain on Saturday, the Saturday practice session was cancelled.

The only practice practice session was held on Friday, March 6.

During the session, Dale Earnhardt, Inc. rookie driver Steve Park would blow a tire heading into turn 4, causing him to slam the outside wall. The car, which had lost brakes by this point, would then proceed to ricochet again into front stretch outside wall two times. After proceeding the second front stretch hit, the car would proceed to head onto pit road, where Park slammed the pit road wall, with the car eventually stopping. Park would suffer fractures of the right thighbone, the left shoulder blade and collarbone and two broken front teeth. In replacement, Phil Parsons would attempt to qualify the car. Park was out for five months before eventually returning in the 1998 Brickyard 400.

Qualifying 
Qualifying was originally meant to be split into two rounds, with the first round ran on Friday, March 6, and the second round on Saturday, March 7. However, due to rain, second-round qualifying was instead condensed into one round ran on Friday.

Qualifying was held on Friday, March 6, at 12:00 PM EST. Each driver would have one lap to set at time. On January 24, 1998, NASCAR would announce that the amount of provisionals given would be increased from last season. Positions 37-43 would be based on provisionals. Six spots are awarded by the use of provisionals based on owner's points. The seventh is awarded to a past champion who has not otherwise qualified for the race. If no past champion needs the provisional, the next team in the owner points will be awarded a provisional.

Seven drivers would fail to qualify: Chad Little, Sterling Marlin, Morgan Shepherd, Andy Hillenburg, Dave Marcis, Phil Parsons, and Jeff Green.

Full qualifying results

Race results

References 

1998 NASCAR Winston Cup Series
NASCAR races at Atlanta Motor Speedway
March 1998 sports events in the United States
1998 in sports in Georgia (U.S. state)